Yat yan fan sik leung gok is a 1995 EP recorded by Chinese Cantopop singer Faye Wong when she was based in Hong Kong.

The title track, by the band AMK with lyrics by Wyman Wong, was the only new song. The others had all been included in Faye Wong's previous albums.

Track listing

Cover versions
Emmy the Great included a cover version of the title track in her 2011 album Virtue as a bonus track for the Asian version. Emmy the Great, who was born in Hong Kong, considers Faye Wong as one of her favorite Cantopop singers.

References

Faye Wong albums
1995 EPs
Cinepoly Records EPs
Cantopop EPs